SMK Tunku Panglima Besar is a school located in Kulim Bandar Bahru, Kulim District, Kedah, Malaysia. It was known as Sekolah Inggeris  Kulim in 1957. Later it was changed to Sek. Men. Kulim and then to the present name, Sek Men Keb Tunku Panglima Besar, in 1991.

Additional information 
SMK Tunku Panglima Besar has hosted the School Athletics Championship in Kulim

In 2021, a Panglima student was the runner-up in the "Murid Cermelang Kokurikulum Sekolah Menegah (Lelaki)" competition

Motto
Memperkasa Panglima

See also
 List of schools in Malaysia
 Ministry of Education (Malaysia)

References

Schools in Kedah
1957 establishments in Malaya
Educational institutions established in 1957
Secondary schools in Malaysia